Kolu (archaic Estonian for load, heavy thing) is a village in Kose Parish, Harju County in northern Estonia. Located near a centuries-old trade road, it's the original location of the Kolu kõrts, originally built around 1840 and currently in the Estonian Open Air Museum.

Ancient sacral sites
The village is a site of protected ancient cult stones.

References

Villages in Harju County